75th Anniversary Selatin Tunnel, is a road tunnel constructed on the motorway O-31 / E87 at the province border of Izmir and Aydın, western Turkey.

Starting on 1 April 1990, its construction was carried out by the joint venture Kutlutaş and Dillingham in New Austrian Tunnelling method (NATM). The cost of the tunnel totalled to US$121 million.

The tunnel was initially named after its location in Selatin village of Germencik district. Following its completion, it was renamed in memory of the 75th anniversary of the foundation of the Turkish Republic (1923).

The tunnel is equipped with a modern electronic road traffic safety and control system as the first ever in Turkey. Dangerous goods carriers are not permitted to use the tunnel.

Civil engineering feat 
Turkish Chamber of Civil Engineers lists 75th year Selatin Tunnel as one of the fifty civil engineering feats in Turkey, a list of remarkable engineering projects realized in the first 50 years of the chamber.

See also
List of motorway tunnels in Turkey

References

Road tunnels in Turkey
Transport in İzmir Province
Transport in Aydın Province
Tunnels completed in 2000